Turkey Creek is a stream in Wayne County in the U.S. state of Missouri. It is a tributary of the Castor River.

Turkey Creek was so named on account of wild turkeys near its course.

See also
List of rivers of Missouri

References

Rivers of Wayne County, Missouri
Rivers of Missouri